HMS Caprice was a  destroyer of the Royal Navy, ordered on 16 February 1942 from Yarrow, Scotstoun. She was originally to be named HMS Swallow but this was changed to Caprice before launch to fit her revised class name. She is the only British warship to have had this name. She was adopted by the Civil Community of Bexley and Welling, as part of the Warship Week programme.

Wartime service
In 1945 she saw action in the Far East at the close of the Japanese War and received the surrender of some 5,000 Japanese prisoners at Uleeheue.

Post war service
Following the war Caprice paid off into reserve.  Along with other Ca group destroyers she was selected for modernisation by Yarrow in 1959. Work included a new enclosed bridge and Mark 6M gunnery fire control system, as well as the addition of two triple Squid anti-submarine mortars. Following the refit, Caprice was sent to the Far East, joining the 8th Destroyer Flotilla at Singapore. She remained in the Far East for four years before returning to Britain. On 1 January 1961, she was on passage from Hong Kong to Singapore when she responded to a distress signal from the Panamanian freighter SS Galatea, which had run aground on Pearson Reef in the Spratly Islands. Caprice saved 20 of the 21-man crew of Galatea, but Galateas captain fell into the sea during the rescue attempts and died. Two of Caprices crew were awarded the Queen's Commendation for Brave Conduct for their part in the rescue.

In 1963, Caprice left the Far East, joining the 21st Destroyer Squadron, and serving in the Mediterranean and the Caribbean. She was Guard ship at Georgetown, Guyana from May to July 1963 and then carried out anti-immigration patrols in the Bahamas from July to August that year. In 1966 Caprice (along with ) received the Sea Cat anti-aircraft missile system - the only two Ca ships to receive it. This meant losing the last of her torpedo tube armament.

In 1966–67, Caprice spent six months away from British waters, including three months on the Beira Patrol in the Mozambique Channel, as part of the oil blockade against Rhodesia, and three weeks at Aden where her security detachment supported the Army in the ongoing Aden Emergency. Three of the ship's crew were wounded during a gunpower demonstration when a WOMBAT recoilless rifle being used by the Army exploded. She returned to Portsmouth on 22 February 1967. On 25 January 1968 Caprice left England for the East of Suez leg of a General Service Commission. She visited Gibraltar, Freetown and Simonstown on the outwatrd leg and then spent a month on duty on the Beira Patrol. The ship arrived in Singapore on 6 April 1968. For the next five months she alternated between Singapore and Hong Kong, carrying out guard duties and exercising with other ships of the Australian, New Zealand and United States navies. During this period she also visited Japan. Leaving Singapore in early September, the ship headed south for a visit to Sydney and took part in exercise Coral Sands until October when the ship arrived in Auckland. She then went on to complete her round-the-world trip, returning to Portsmouth on 19 December 1969.

Decommissioning and disposal
She was paid off in 1973 as the last war time destroyer in service.  She was disarmed and laid up until November 1979 when she arrived at the breaker's yard at Queenborough for scrapping.

References

Publications

External links
 HMS Caprice 1968 website

 

World War II destroyers of the United Kingdom
Cold War destroyers of the United Kingdom
1943 ships
Ships built on the River Clyde
C-class destroyers (1943) of the Royal Navy